Khorga (Khorgo) is a rural locality (a settlement) in Yeravninsky District, Republic of Buryatia, Russia. The population was 127 as of 2010. There are 4 streets.

Geography 
Gunda is the nearest rural locality.

References 

Rural localities in Yeravninsky District